The Mon-Almonte Treaty restored relations between Mexico and Spain. It was signed on 26 September 1859 by Juan N. Almonte, Mexican conservative and Alejandro Mon, representative of Queen Isabella II of Spain, in Mexico.

The treaty was signed by Mexican conservatives in their search for support in their struggle against liberal during the Reform War. Among the main aspects of the treaty was a loan to the conservative faction, which had to be paid on their triumph, but the debt ended up with the Liberal government, which won the war, adding to Mexico's already-large external debt with European nations.

With the treaty, conservatives sought to draw the attention of European crowns to support their cause, but like the 1859 McLane-Ocampo Treaty between the liberal government of Benito Juárez and the United States, it never entered into force.

See also
Reform War

References 
 Mon-Almonte Treaty

1859 in Spain
1859 in Mexico
1859 in politics
Mexico–Spain relations
Treaties of Mexico
1859 treaties